Sophie Kerr (August 23, 1880 – February 6, 1965) was a prolific writer of the early 20th century whose stories about smart, ambitious women mirrored her own evolution from small-town girl to successful career woman. At a time when few women were financially self-sufficient, Kerr made her way from Maryland’s Eastern Shore to New York City, where she supported herself as a magazine editor and a writer of more than 500 short stories, 23 novels, several poems and a play that ran on Broadway.

Her bequest to Washington College on Maryland’s Eastern Shore in 1965 stipulated that the proceeds of the $578,000 endowment be used to fund an annual literary prize and to support literary events and scholarships at the college. Since 1968, the college in Chestertown has awarded more than $1.4 million in prize money to promising young writers and has enabled Washington College to bring a succession of the nation’s literary luminaries to the small liberal arts college located just 30 miles from where she grew up.

The childhood home of Sophie Kerr, a circa 1860 farmhouse on the corner of 5th and Kerr Avenues in Denton, Maryland, still stands. She specifically describes the house in her short story, “Coming Home for Christmas.”

Life and career
Born in the Caroline County town of Denton, Maryland, in 1880, Sophie Kerr graduated from Denton High School in 1895 and went on to earn a bachelor's degree from Hood College and a master's degree from the University of Vermont. She married John DeLoss Underwood, a civil engineer, in 1904 and divorced him four years later.

In order to support herself, Kerr went into journalism, launching her career in Pittsburgh, Pa. as the women’s page editor at the Chronicle Telegraph and the Pittsburgh Gazette. Moving to New York, she became managing editor of The Woman's Home Companion. and published her fiction in other popular magazines of the day, including Saturday Evening Post, Collier’s Saturday Review of Literature and McCalls. From 1920 until her death in 1965 at age 84, Kerr lived in a brownstone residence at 115 East 38th Street, where she created something of a literary salon for her friends in publishing and theater. In 1942, as part of a celebration of the 50th anniversary of co-education at Washington College, she accepted an honorary degree along with Eleanor Roosevelt.

While her fiction is largely unknown to contemporary readers and her books are long out of print, her stories dealt with class and gender issues at work in the first half of the 20th century. “Kerr wrote stories about plucky heroines, young women who rose to the challenge and went for the gusto. They had big dreams and lots of charm and tons of blond curls. For the most part, they were smart and unassuming and hopelessly, wonderfully, kind, but they had ambition. Even her seemingly vapid heroines had hearts of gold and wills of iron hidden under all their finery.”

In her will, she left the bulk of her estate to Washington College, with the stipulation that half its income would be awarded annually to the senior showing “the most ability and promise for future fulfillment in the field of literary endeavor.” The other half funds scholarships, student publications and a series of visits by renowned writers.

The Sophie Kerr Prize

The Sophie Kerr Prize is awarded each year to a graduating senior at Washington College in Chestertown, Maryland who has demonstrated the best ability and promise for future fulfillment in the field of literary endeavor.  The prize is announced at Washington College just prior to the senior commencement ceremony. Valued at $65,768 in 2016, it is the nation's largest undergraduate literary prize. Indeed, it is among the largest in the world, exceeding the Pulitzer Prize, National Book Award, and National Book Critics Circle.

Applicants submit portfolios of what they deem to be their best writing, which may include critical essays, creative nonfiction, poetry, fiction, journalism, stage plays, screenplays, blogging, graphic novels, or other hybrid forms. In a typical year, between 20 and 30 seniors submit portfolios for consideration. In the past, the prize has been awarded for both creative and critical writing. The 2011 Sophie Kerr Prize was awarded to Lisa Jones, an anthropology major who wrote about her life-changing trip to Tanzania. In a break from tradition, Washington College announced the winner at the Poets House in New York City where Sophie Kerr lived for more than 40 years.

The first Sophie Kerr Prize, valued at $9,000, was awarded to a Washington College senior in 1968. The exact value varies according to the return on the endowment. Since its inception, the Sophie Kerr Endowment has provided more than $1.4 million in prize money to promising young writers and has brought literary stars such as Toni Morrison, Katherine Ann Porter, Edward Albee, Natasha Trethewey, and Colum McCann to the Washington College campus.

Selected works

 Love at Large, 1916
 Blue Envelope, (*filmed as The Blue Envelope Mystery)
 The Golden Block, 1918
 The See-Saw, 1919
 Painted Meadows, 1920 
 One Thing is Certain, 1922
 Mareea-Maria, 1929
 Tigers Is Only Cats, 1929
 In For a Penny, 1931
 Girl Into Woman, 1932
 Stay Out of My Life, 1934
 Miss J. Looks On, 1935
 There's Only One, 1936
 Fine to Look At, 1937
 Adventure With Women, 1938
 Curtain Going Up, 1940
 The Beautiful Woman, 1941
 Michaels's Girls, 1942
 Jenny Devlin, 1943
 Love Story Incidental, 1946
 Wife's Eye View, 1947
 As Tall As Pride, 1949
 The Man Who Knew the Date, 1951

References

External links
The Sophie Kerr Legacy (archived 17 March 2017)
 Finding aid to Sophie Kerr papers at Columbia University. Rare Book & Manuscript Library.
The Rose O'Neill Literary House at Washington College
Washington College Home Page
http://articles.baltimoresun.com/2004-05-16/entertainment/0405170337_1_sophie-kerr-saint-sophie-kerr-prize/7
https://web.archive.org/web/20110227080745/http://ncteamericancollection.org/litmap/kerr_sophie_md.htm
http://articles.baltimoresun.com/1997-05-16/features/1997136029_1_sophie-kerr-writing-alive-washington-college
 
 
 

1880 births
1965 deaths
American women novelists
American women poets
American women short story writers
Hood College alumni
People from Denton, Maryland
Writers from Pittsburgh
University of Vermont alumni
Washington College people
20th-century American novelists
20th-century American poets
20th-century American women writers
20th-century American short story writers
Novelists from Pennsylvania
Novelists from Maryland
Women's page journalists
American salon-holders